Sveti Grgur (lit. Saint Gregory) is an uninhabited island in Croatia, on the Adriatic Sea between Rab and Krk. The island was the site of a women's prison in SFR Yugoslavia, in tandem with nearby Goli Otok which served the same purpose for men, from 1948 to 1988.

See also
Goli otok
 Persecution of Danube Swabians

Literature
Milutin Popović, Sećanja na logor Sveti Grgur. Symix graphics, Beograd, 1991.
Ženi Lebl, LJUBIČICA BELA-White Violete with the subtitle "Two and half years in the Yugoslav Gulag for women", Belgrade, 2009

External links

Islands of Croatia
Islands of the Adriatic Sea
Defunct prisons in Croatia
Political repression in Communist Yugoslavia
Prisons in Yugoslavia
Uninhabited islands of Croatia
Landforms of Primorje-Gorski Kotar County